is a combined railway station and metro station located in Taishō-ku, Osaka, Japan. The station is served by the Osaka Loop Line and the Nagahori Tsurumi-ryokuchi Line.

Lines
 Osaka Loop Line

 (N11)

Layout

JR West Osaka Loop Line
JR West station has two side platforms serving two tracks elevated, administrated by Shin-Imamiya Station. IC ride cards ICOCA, PiTaPa and other 8 brands are accepted.

Osaka Metro Nagahori Tsurumi-ryokuchi Line
Subway station has an island platform fenced with platform gates between two tracks under the ground level. IC ride cards PiTaPa, ICOCA and other 8 brands and Surutto KANSAI ride cards are accepted.

Trains arrive at Platform 2 and disembark passengers, and return at the sidetracks in the south of the station, then enter Platform 1 as ones for Kadoma-minami.

Train services in off-peak hours
JR West Osaka Loop Line
12 clockwise-bound trains go to Osaka, of which:
4 are local trains and stop at every station.
8 are rapid services and stop at Bentencho, Nishikujo and every station from Fukushima.
12 counterclockwise-bound trains go to Tennoji, of which:
4 are local trains to Tsuruhashi.
4 are Yamatoji rapid services to Nara via the Yamatoji Line, 2 of which continue to Kamo.
4 are Kansai Airport rapid services to Kansai Airport and Kishuji rapid services to Wakayama via the Hanwa Line.
Osaka Metro Nagahori Tsurumi-ryokuchi Line
8 or 9 trains go to Kadoma-minami (every 7 minutes).

Surroundings
Osaka Dome (a 7-minute walk from JR West station)
Taisho Post Office
Taisho Bridge
Iwasaki Bridge
Onami Bridge

Bus routes (Taishobashi)
Buses are operated by Osaka City Bus. See the external link for details of Taishobashi Bus Stop.

Route 51 for Tempozan via Bentencho-ekimae and Daisan Tottei-mae / for Dome-mae Chiyozaki
Route 60 for Tempozan via Sakaigawa and Subway Asashiobashi / for Namba (Takashimaya)
Route 70 for Nishi-Funamachi via Taisho Kuyakusho-mae and Daiumbashi-dori / for Dome-mae Chiyozaki
Route 70 Express for Nishi-Funamachi via Taisho Kuyakusho-mae and Daiumbashi-dori / for Dome-mae Chiyozaki
Route 71 for Tsurumachi Yonchome via Taisho Kuyakusho-mae and Daiumbashi-dori / for Namba
Route 76 for Subway Suminoekoen / for Dome-mae Chiyozaki
Route 87 for Tsurumachi Yonchome via Shin-Chitose / for Namba
Route 90 for Tsurumachi Yonchome via Taisho Kuyakusho-mae and Daiumbashi-dori / for Nodahanshin-mae
Route 91 for Tsurumachi Yonchome via Taisho Kuyakusho-mae and Daiumbashi-dori / for Dome-mae Chiyozaki
Route 91 Express for Tsurumachi Yonchome via Taisho Kuyakusho-mae and Daiumbashi-dori / for Dome-mae Chiyozaki
Route 94 for Tsurumachi Yonchome via Chishima Koen-mae and Daiumbashi-dori / for Dome-mae Chiyozaki
Route 98 for Taisho Kuyakusho-mae via Shin-Chitose / for Dome-mae Chiyozaki

History 
Station numbering was introduced to the JR West facilities in March 2018 with Taisho being assigned station number JR-O16.

Adjacent Stations

References 

Railway stations in Osaka Prefecture
Osaka Metro stations
Osaka Loop Line
Railway stations in Japan opened in 1961